Omer Senior (born 23 February 2003) is an Israeli footballer who currently plays as a midfielder for Hapoel Tel Aviv and the Israel national under-19 team.

Club career
He plays for Israeli Premier League team Hapoel Tel Aviv as a midfielder since 2020.

Career statistics

Club

References

2003 births
Living people
Israeli footballers
Israel youth international footballers
Association football midfielders
Hapoel Tel Aviv F.C. players
Israeli Premier League players
Footballers from Tel Aviv